Noorda blitealis is a species of moth of the family Crambidae. It is found in subtropical Africa, south of the Sahara and in Australasia (Australia, Sri Lanka, India, Thailand).

It has a wingspan of about 19–22 mm.

Host plants
The larvae are an important defoliator of Moringa oleifera (Moringaceae)

References

External links
 "Noorda blitealis Walker, 1859". African Moths. - with pictures
 "Noorda blitealis Walker, 1859". (July 17, 2012). Lépidoptères de La Réunion. - with pictures

Crambidae
Moths described in 1859
Moths of Madagascar
Moths of Seychelles
Moths of Réunion
Moths of Sub-Saharan Africa